Acanthastrea rotundoflora is a species of coral found in Indo-Pacific waters from the Red Sea to Australia and the East China Sea. The species in uncommon throughout its range, and is threatened by the global loss of coral reef habitats.

Description
Colonies of Acanthastrea rotundoflora are either massive or encrusting. The corallites are plocoid and rather widely separated, and in small colonies there is a conspicuous central corallite. The septa have long pointed teeth. The general colour of this coral is rusty-brown, dark brown or green.

Biology
Acanthastrea rotundoflora is a zooxanthellate species of coral. It obtains most of its nutritional needs from the symbiotic dinoflagellates that live inside its soft tissues. These photosynthetic organisms provide the coral with organic carbon and nitrogen, sometimes providing up to 90% of their host's energy needs for metabolism and growth. Its remaining needs are met by the planktonic organisms caught by the tentacles of the polyps.

Status
This coral has a wide range and is moderately common. It is less susceptible to coral bleaching than some related species because it occurs in deeper water. The population trend for this species is unclear, but the main threats faced by corals in general are related to climate change and the mechanical destruction of their coral reef habitats; increasing damage from extreme weather events, rising sea water temperatures and ocean acidification. The International Union for Conservation of Nature has assessed the conservation status of this species as being a "near-threatened species". All corals receive protection by being listed on CITES Appendix II.

References

Lobophylliidae
Animals described in 1975
Near threatened animals